Paulo Sérgio is a Portuguese given name. It may refer to:

Given names
Paulo Sérgio (footballer, born 1954), Brazilian footballer
Paulo Sérgio (footballer, born 1968), Portuguese footballer and coach
Paulo Sérgio (footballer, born 1969), Brazilian footballer, 1994 World Champion
Paulo Sérgio (footballer, born 1971), Portuguese footballer
Paulo Sérgio (footballer, born 1972), Brazilian footballer
Paulo Sérgio (footballer, born 1981), Brazilian footballer
Paulo Sérgio (footballer, born 1984), Portuguese footballer
Paulo Sérgio (footballer, born 1989), Brazilian footballer

Other people
Paulo Sérgio Rosa (born 1969), usually known as Viola, 1994 World Champion
Paulo Sérgio de Oliveira Silva, usually known as Serginho (1974-2004), Brazilian footballer
Paulo Sérgio Betanin (born 1986), usually known as Paulinho, Brazilian footballer
Sérgio Paulo Barbosa Valente (born 1980), nicknamed Duda, Portuguese footballer

See also

 
Paulo
Sérgio
Serginho (disambiguation)

Portuguese masculine given names